Lake Alice is a small lake approximately  south west of Marton in the Manawatū-Whanganui region of the North Island. The nearby Lake Alice Hospital that closed in 1999 is named after the lake.

See also
Lake Alice Hospital

References

Lakes of Manawatū-Whanganui